Carlton Ray Scott Jr. (born December 5, 1969, in Semora, North Carolina) is an American country music artist.  He first gained attention in 2005 with his debut album My Kind of Music, and has since released five albums and two EPS.

Career
Scott has a distinctive southern voice and wears a cowboy hat. 
Warner Brothers released his debut album, My Kind of Music, and its title track became a top 40 single in 2005.

Scott split from the Warner Brothers label two years later. He independently released Crazy Like Me (2008) and Rayality (2011), which gave him a physical product on the road and support from Sirius XM. "Drinkin Beer" and "Ain’t Always Thirsty" received Sirius airplay, as did one of his most well-known singles: "Those Jeans" from the Rayality album, produced by Dave Brainard (Jerrod Neimann, Brandy Clark). Then came his 5th studio album in 2017 — Guitar for Sale, produced by Michael Hughes.

Hughes and Scott paired up again for Honky Tonk Heart, an EP released on March 1, 2019.  According to Scott, ""Honky Tonk Heart" is all about who I am, and it's an ode to all the troubadours out there runnin' up and down the highways keeping real country music alive because they love it, live it, and breathe it."

Scott's second EP, Nowhere Near Done, was released in February 2020.

Discography

Studio albums

EPs

Singles

Music videos

References

External links
 Ray Scott Official Website

American country singer-songwriters
American male singer-songwriters
Living people
Singer-songwriters from North Carolina
Warner Records artists
People from Caswell County, North Carolina
1975 births